Alexander Drummond may refer to:
Alexander Drummond (cricketer) (1888–1937), English cricketer
Alexander Drummond (consul) (died 1769), English consul
Alexander Drummond (programmer) from Symphony OS
Alex Drummond, The Bill character

See also